Mohariya Tole is one of the oldest areas of Pokhara where people first settled in the valley. This was also an area of prominent commercial activities before 1960.

References

Neighbourhoods in Pokhara